The 2022–23 Merrimack Warriors Men's ice hockey season was the 68th season of play for the program, the 34th at the Division I level, and the 34th in the Hockey East conference. The Warriors represented Merrimack College and were coached by Scott Borek, in his 5th season.

Season
On October 4, Merrimack announced the death of assistant coach Josh Ciocco.

Departures

Recruiting

Roster
As of September 27, 2022.

Standings

Schedule and results

|-
!colspan=12 style=";" | Regular Season

|-
!colspan=12 style=";" | 

|-
!colspan=12 style=";" | 

|-
!colspan=12 style=";" |

Scoring statistics

Goaltending statistics

Rankings

References

2022-23
Merrimack
Merrimack
Merrimack
Merrimack